Lauri Simo Kivinen (born 2 April 1961, Vaasa) is the former CEO of the Finnish Broadcasting Company. He had previously held numerous management positions at Nokia and at Nokia Siemens Networks. Overall, Kivinen has spent more than twenty years within the telecommunications industry.

Biography 
Lauri Simo Kivinen was born on 2 April 1961 in Vaasa, Ostrobothnia, Finland. Little else is known about Kivinen's early life.

Kivinen obtained a Master's degree in Economics after studies at the Turku School of Economics in Turku, Finland, and in St. Gallen, Switzerland.

Career 
Kivinen has held various senior roles at both Nokia and at Nokia Siemens Networks. Kivinen has been known to his contemporaries as a "steadfast and passionate leader with a hands-on management style." He has a proven record of developing great partnerships. Lauri is said to have a strong experience in interfacing with various corporate stakeholders.

List of positions held 
 Communications Manager for Nokia Group in Helsinki ~ 1988
 Communications Manager for Nokia Consumer Electronics in Geneva ~ 1989
 Vice-President of Communications at Nokia Mobile Phones ~ 1992
 Head of Nokia's Brussels representative office ~ 2004-2007
 Board member of the European Digital Technology Industry Association ~ 2007-2008

References 

Nokia people
1961 births
People from Vaasa
Living people